North Oconee High School (NOHS) is a public school located in Bogart, Georgia, United States. It opened in 2004 and is the second public high school in Oconee County.

The school's mascot is Titus, and its colors are red, black, and gold. The school currently has upwards of 1300 students.

Academics

North Oconee consistently rates highly in academic standings. The high school is continually regarded as one of the top high schools in Georgia. It is ranked in the top 2% of schools nationally, and as the top school in SAT and ACT scores in northeast Georgia. According to data supplied by the Georgia Department of Education, the school's 2010 preliminary graduation rate was 92.5%.

The Georgia High School Graduation Test reports rates by school system. The Georgia Department of Education, aggregating scores of both North Oconee High School and Oconee County High School, ranks Oconee County in the top 5 of the 180 Georgia school systems. The Newsweek ranking of top high schools consistently names North Oconee in the top 5% of high schools in the nation.

Both Oconee County high schools were named Advanced Placement Merit Schools, the only two public high schools in the greater Athens area to receive this recognition. To receive this distinction, at least 20% of the students must take AP exams, with 50% or more scoring the passing score of 3 or higher.

According to the demographics from the Georgia Department of Education, approximately 87% of the student body are White, 4% Black, 4% Hispanic, and 2% are of mixed ethnicity. About 25% are enrolled in the gifted program and less than 1% are enrolled in remedial education. Over 69% of graduates are eligible for the Hope Scholarship.

North Oconee has approximately 80 teachers. About 73% hold master's degrees or higher.

Athletic teams
The school competes at the AAAA division level in region 8. It competes in many major local and regional high school athletics.

Fall sports
Football
Cross country
Football cheerleading
Competition cheerleading
Softball
Volleyball
Winter sports
Esports
Wrestling
Boys basketball
Girls basketball
Basketball cheerleading
Swimming and diving
Spring sports
Boys soccer
Girls soccer
Boys golf
Girls golf
Boys lacrosse
Girls lacrosse
Track and field
Tennis
Baseball

Athletic championships

 Girls' tennis team won the first place in State GHSAA Division 8AAAA for the 2016–2017 season.
 Girls' track and field won the first place in GHSAA Division AA in 2008 and 2010.
 Girls' soccer won the GHSAA state championship in 2021 for AAAA

NOHS Titan Regiment

The Regiment is the ambassadorial music organization for North Oconee High School. During the fall season, the Titan Regiment functions and performs as a marching band, and in the spring, a concert band. The band also has some optional programs, such as a Jazz Band and Solo Ensemble.

Titan Regiment (Marching Band) 

During the fall season, the Titan Regiment Marching Band performs halftime shows and 'stands tunes' during football games. The band also participates in marching competitions across Georgia. Among the marching band's competition awards are:

 2021-2022 Grovetown Invitational - All Superior ratings In Open Class - 2nd place band - 1st place color guard - 2nd place drum major - 2nd place percussion 
 2021-2022 Sound of the County Invitational at Harris County HS - All superior ratings In Open Class - 2nd place band - 1st place color guard - 2nd place drumline - 2nd place drum major
 2020-2021 Lake Lanier Tournament of Bands - All Superior Ratings - 2nd Place 4A Band
 2020-2021 Lake Hartwell Marching Competition - All Superior Ratings In class 4A - 1st Place Band
 2019-2020 Grovetown Invitational at Grovetown High School - All superior ratings - 1st place band in class 4A
 2019-2020 Golden River Marching Festival at Haralson County High School - All superior ratings - 1st place band in class 4A - Best front ensemble award
 2018-2019 Georgia Contest of Champions at East Jackson High School - Overall Grand Champion Band - All Superior Ratings - 1st place band in class 4A
 2018-2019 Lake Lanier Tournament of Bands at Chestatee High School - All Superior Ratings - 1st place band in class 4A
 2017-2018 Band-Superior-2nd place in class 3A
 2017-2018 Bowdon Invitational Marching Festival and Competition - Band Superior, 2nd place in class 3A 
 2016-2017 Peach State Classic - Band Superior, 2nd place in class 3A 
 2016-2017 Georgia Contest of Champions - Band Superior, 1st place in class 3A
 2015-2016 Georgia Contest of Champions - Band Superior, 1st place in class 2A
 2015-2016 Creekview Classic - Band Superior - 1st place in class 2A
 2014-2015 Golden River Marching Festival - Band Superior, 2nd Place – Class AAA
 2013-2014 Greater Atlanta Area Marching Contest - Band Superior, 1st Place – Class AAA
 2013-2014 Lake Lanier Tournament of Bands - Band Superior, 1st Place – Class AAA
 2012-2013 Lake Hartwell Marching Festival and Competition - Superior 1st Place Band in Class AA
 2012-2013 Armuchee Invitational Marching Festival and Competition - Superior, Class AA: Band, Percussion, and Color Guard; Class AA: Percussion 3rd, Flagline 2nd
 2011-2012 Lake Lanier Tournament of Bands - Superior, Class AA: Band, Percussion, Drum Major, and Color Guard; Class AA: Band 2nd, Percussion 1st, Drum major 1st, and Color Guard 1st; Silver Division: Percussion 1st, Drum Major 1st, and Color Guard 1st
 2011-2012 Greater Atlanta Area Marching Contest - Superior, Class AA: Band, Percussion, Drum Major, and Color Guard; Class AA: Band 1st, Percussion 2nd, Drum major 1st, and Color Guard 1st; Grand Champions Silver Division 
 2010-2011 Heart of Georgia - Superior, Class AA: Band, Percussion, Drum Major and Color Guard; Champion, AA Division; Contest: Best Effects; Contest: Best Visual; Contest: Grand Champion over 20 bands, 10 of which were 3AA or larger
 2010-2011 Georgia Tournament of Champions - Superior, Class AA, Band, Percussion, Color Guard, and Drum Major; Grand Champion, Silver Division
 2009-2010 Peachtree Ridge Festival - Large Group - Superior, Class AAA
 2009-2010 Lake Lanier Tournament - Superior, Class AAA, All categories, Grand Champion, Drum Major
 2009-2010 Greater Atlanta Marching Contest - Superior, Class AAA, All Categories
 2008-2009 Greater Atlanta Marching Contest - Superior, Class AAA
 2008-2009 Georgia Bandmasters - Superior Class AAA - all categories, Grand Champions, Silver Division
 2008-2009 UGA Festival - Large Group Performance - Superior
 2007-2008 Fort Mountain Marching Contest - Superior
 2006-2007 Greater Atlanta Area Marching Band Contest - Superior; 1st Place Band - Class AA
 2005-2006 Yellow Jacket Classic - Superior
 2005-2006 Fort Mountain Marching Contest - Superior; 1st Place Band - Class AA
 2004-2005 Georgia Mountain Marching Festival - Superior

Concert Band 
The North Oconee High School's concert band consists of brass, woodwind, and percussion instruments. The concert band classes will rehearse music, preparing for concerts throughout the semester. As well as concerts, the band also participates in GMEA LGPE (Large Group Performance Evaluation), where the band's performance will be adjudicated and rated. Recently, the concert band has been split into a 'Symphonic Band' and a 'Wind Ensemble' due to an abundance of students registered in a concert band class.

Feeder schools
Middle schools
Malcom Bridge Middle School
Elementary schools
Malcom Bridge Elementary 
Rocky Branch Elementary 
High Shoals Elementary 
Dove Creek Elementary

Notable alumni

Kumar Rocker, Texas Rangers 3rd overall pick in the 2022 MLB Draft
John Wes Townley, Former NASCAR Driver

People Named Seth
Seth Shi, All-State Clarinet Player

References

External links
North Oconee High School website
North Oconee High School Band website
Oconee County School System
Georgia Department of Education

Educational institutions established in 2004
Public high schools in Georgia (U.S. state)
Schools in Oconee County, Georgia
2004 establishments in Georgia (U.S. state)